Frank Wills (1822–1857) was a British-born architect who is associated with the design of early Gothic Revival churches in North America.

Biography
Frank Wills was born in Exeter, Devon, England in 1822, where he started working under John Hayward. He was a member of the Exeter Architectural Society, and his first known work is a canopied tomb in Gothic style beside the high altar in St. Thomas' Church in Exeter.  In 1842, Wills exhibited at the Royal Academy of Arts in London.

He emigrated to New Brunswick in 1845 to work on Christ Church Cathedral in Fredericton, which he modelled on St. Mary's Church in Snettisham, Norfolk.  He moved to New York City, began an architectural firm in late 1847 and married Emily Coster in 1848. He became associated with the New York Ecclesiology Society and soon was the official architect for that group.  In 1850 he published Ancient Ecclesiastical Architecture and Its Principles, Applied to the Wants of the Church at the Present Day. Emily died in that same year.

In 1851 he took a partner into his firm, Henry Dudley, who had also worked under Hayward in Exeter.  He remarried to Almy Warne Casey in November 1853; she was the daughter of the Philadelphia iron merchant James Casey.  They had one son, Charles James Wills.  Frank Wills died suddenly in Montreal in 1857, where he was working on Christ Church Cathedral.

Works
Selected works by him or his firm include:
 Christ Church Cathedral (1845–53) in Fredericton, New Brunswick.
 St. Anne's Chapel (1846–47) in Fredericton, New Brunswick.
 The Church of the Holy Innocents (1848) in Albany, New York.
 Grace Church (1849–52) in Albany, New York.
 The House of Prayer (1849–53) in Newark, New Jersey.
 St. Peter's Episcopal Church (1848–1860) in Spotswood, New Jersey.
 Anglican Church (1850) in Burton, New Brunswick.
 St. Peter's Church (1850–51) in Milford, Connecticut.
 Chapel of the Cross (1850–52) in Madison, Mississippi.
 St. Mary's Church (1851) in Abingdon, Maryland.
 Montgomery House (c. 1852) in Madison, Mississippi
 Holy Trinity Episcopal Church (1852–53) in Nashville, Tennessee.
 Trinity Episcopal Church (1853–57) in Mobile, Alabama.
 Christ Church (1853) in Napoleonville, Louisiana.
 Holy Trinity Church (1853) in Claremont, New Hampshire.
 St. George's Church (1853–54) in Flushing, New York.
 St. John's Church (1853–58) in Troy, New York.
 St. Michael's Church (1854) in Sillery, Quebec.
 Christ's Church, Rye (1854–55) in Rye, New York (subsequently rebuilt).
 St. John's Episcopal Church (1854–55) in Montgomery, Alabama.
 Christ Church (1855–59) in Oberlin, Ohio.
 Trinity Episcopal Church (1856-69) in Connersville, Indiana.
 Episcopal Church of the Nativity (1857–59) in Huntsville, Alabama.
 Christ Church Cathedral (1857–59) in Montreal, Quebec.
 Saint George's (1856–58) in Portage-du-Fort, Quebec, Canada

Also, based on similarities, three other churches are believed to be from his firm:
 Trinity Episcopal Church (1855) Scotland Neck, North Carolina.
 Church of the Nativity (1856–59) in Union, South Carolina.
 Trinity Church (1857–60) in Natchitoches, Louisiana.

References

External links 
 Biography at the Dictionary of Canadian Biography Online
 Historic Places of Canada

British emigrants to the United States
English ecclesiastical architects
Gothic Revival architects
1822 births
1857 deaths
Architects of cathedrals
American ecclesiastical architects
Canadian ecclesiastical architects
19th-century American architects
Architects from Exeter
Architects from New York City